The banded snail sucker (Tropidodipsas fasciata) is a species of snake of the family Colubridae.

Geographic range
The snake is found in Mexico, in the states of Guerrero, Tamaulipas, Veracruz and Oaxaca, and possibly in Guatemala.

References 

Reptiles described in 1858
Taxa named by Albert Günther
Reptiles of Mexico
Reptiles of Central America